Sengalvarayaswamy  Temple is a Hindu temple dedicated to the deity Shiva, located at Tiruttani in Kancheepuram district, Tamil Nadu, India. It is also known as Sengalvarayaswamy Sengazhunir Vinayaka Temple and Sengalvarayaswamy Subramaniar Temple.

Vaippu Sthalam
It is one of the Vaippu Sthalams mentioned in songs by Tamil Saivite Nayanar Appar, one of the 63 Hindu saints living in Tamil Nadu during the 6th to 8th centuries CE.

Presiding deity
The presiding deity represented by the lingam is known as Sengalvarayaswamy.

References

Hindu temples in Kanchipuram district
Shiva temples in Kanchipuram district